was a Japanese cinematographer born in Hyōgo Prefecture. He worked on several films with director Akira Kurosawa. In 1950, he won the Mainichi Film Award for Best Cinematography for Stray Dog. He was nominated for the Academy Award for Best Cinematography for his work on the film Ran (1985), being the oldest nominee ever in that category.

Selected filmography
 1943: The Song Lantern
 1949: Stray Dog
 1954: Seven Samurai
 1957: Throne of Blood
 1961: The End of Summer
 1963: High and Low
 1965: Red Beard
 1975: Dersu Uzala
 1985: Ran

References

External links
 

Japanese cinematographers
1901 births
1988 deaths